Melody with Milton is an Australian television series which aired from 1958 to 1960 on Sydney station ATN-7. It was a daytime music series with pianist Milton Saunders. In a 1958 TV schedule, it was preceded on the schedule by Your Home, In a May 1959 schedule, it was preceded by American series The Halls of Ivy. The series aired live, and it is not known if any of the episodes were kinescoped (video-tape in those days tended to be re-used to tape other programming, and surviving examples of late-1950s/early-1960s Australian television are usually kinescopes rather than tapes).

References

External links

1958 Australian television series debuts
1960 Australian television series endings
Black-and-white Australian television shows
Australian music television series
English-language television shows